Rob Buyea (born 1983) is an American children's fiction author best known for his Mr. Terupt series of novels. In 2011, Buyea won an E.B. White Read Aloud Award for Because of Mr. Terupt. He is now a full time author, residing with his wife, three daughters, and two dogs in North Andover, Massachusetts.

Education
Buyea earned a B.S. from the in biology from the College of Arts and Sciences (1999) and a M.A. in education from the School of Education (2000), both at Syracuse University. He was a wrestler on the Syracuse Orange team.

Bibliography
Because of Mr. Terupt, 2010
Mr. Terupt Falls Again, 2012
Saving Mr. Terupt, 2015
The Perfect Score, 2017
The Perfect Secret, 2018
The Perfect Star, 2019
Goodbye, Mr. Terupt, 2020
What Comes Next, 2021

References

External links

 

1976 births
Living people
People from North Andover, Massachusetts
21st-century American male writers
21st-century American novelists
American children's writers
American educators
American male novelists
Syracuse Orangemen wrestlers
Syracuse University College of Arts and Sciences alumni
Syracuse University School of Education alumni
Writers from Massachusetts